Gymnastics events at the 2017 Bolivarian Games took place from November 11 to November 17, 2017.

Medalists

Artistic gymnastics

Men

Women

Rhythmic gymnastics

Women

Trampoline

References

International gymnastics competitions hosted by Colombia
Artistic gymnastics competitions
Rhythmic gymnastics competitions
Bolivarian Games,2017
2017 in gymnastics
2017